The Quỳnh Lưu uprising was a rebellion against the North Vietnamese communist government in the rural Quỳnh Lưu District in Nghệ An Province, from November 2–14, 1956.

Background and Origins

Land Reform 
The North Vietnamese regime instituted their land reform program from 1953 to 1956, with the government's stated aims being to placate the peasant's hunger for land and break the power of the traditional village elite. However, the land reform was accompanied by large-scale repression and excesses,
which led to popular resentment. In the Quỳnh Lưu area, locals had been discriminated against by local authorities because of their opposition to the land reform and other reforms carried out by the government.

Communist Prevention of Emigration 
According to the 1954 Geneva Accords, of which North Vietnam was signatory to, Vietnam was partitioned into two halves, with a communist Viet Minh-controlled North Vietnam, and an anti-communist State of Vietnam (which became South Vietnam) with Bao Dai as head of state. There would be a 300-day period, ending May 18, 1955, where people could relocate freely to 1 of the 2 Vietnams of their choosing before the border at the 17th parallel was sealed. However, in late 1954 and early 1955, along with counter-propaganda, the Viet Minh sought to prevent would-be refugees from leaving. As the American and French military personnel were only present in the major cities and at air bases and on the waterfront, the communists tried to stop people from trying to leave through a military presence in the inland ruralside to interdict the flow of would-be refugees.

References 

1956 in Vietnam
History of Nghệ An province
Rebellions in Vietnam
Conflicts in 1956